This is a complete list of ice hockey players who were drafted in the National Hockey League by the Chicago Blackhawks franchise. It includes every player who was drafted, regardless of whether they played for the team.

The NHL Entry Draft is held each June, allowing teams to select players who have turned 18 years old by September 15 in the year the draft is held.  The draft order is determined by the previous season's order of finish, with non-playoff teams drafting first, followed by the teams that made the playoffs, with the specific order determined by the number of points earned by each team.  The NHL holds a weighted lottery for the 14 non-playoff teams, allowing the winner to move up a maximum of four positions in the entry draft.  The team with the fewest points has the best chance of winning the lottery, with each successive team given a lower chance of moving up in the draft. Between 1986 and 1994, the NHL also held a Supplemental Draft for players in American colleges.

Key

Draft picks

Statistics are complete as of the 2021–22 NHL season and show each player's career regular season totals in the NHL.  Wins, losses, ties, overtime losses and goals against average apply to goaltenders and are used only for players at that position. A player listed with a blank under the games played column has not played in the NHL.

See also
List of Chicago Blackhawks players

References

Specific

General

External links
blackhawks.nhl.com - full list of Chicago Blackhawks draft picks

 
draft picks
Chicago Blackhawks